Masoud Hassanzadeh (born April 12, 1991) is an Iranian footballer who plays as a forward for Zob Ahan in the Persian Gulf Pro League.

Club career

Early years
Hassanzadeh started his career with Esteghlal at youth levels. Later he joined Damash Tehran U19 & Naft Tehran U21.

Damash Gilan
After a half-season at Division 1 with Mes Rafsanjan, he joined Pro League side Damash. He made his debut against Fajr Sepasi on February 9, 2013 as a substitute. He scored his first goal for Damash against Foolad on August 10, 2013.

Zob Ahan
He joined Zob Ahan in summer 2014 with a fee around R4 billion. Hassanzadeh scored in the penalty shoot out in the final of the 2016 Hazfi Cup against Esteghlal, a game which Zob Ahan won.

Club career statistics

International career

U–22
He invited to Iran U–22 squad to compete 2013 AFC U-22 Championship by Alireza Mansourian.

Senior
Hassanzadeh was invited to the Iran senior team on 12 December 2014 by Carlos Queiroz for upcoming South Africa training camp. He made his debut against Sweden on 31 March 2015.

Personal life
Masoud was born in Tehran and Hassanzadeh's family is Iranian Azerbaijani from the Tabriz city of East Azerbaijan.

Honours

Club
Zob Ahan
Hazfi Cup (2): 2014–15, 2015–16

References

External links 
 Masoud Hassanzadeh at PersianLeague.com

1991 births
Living people
Iranian footballers
Persian Gulf Pro League players
Esteghlal F.C. players
Damash Gilan players
Zob Ahan Esfahan F.C. players
People from Tehran
Association football forwards